The presence of psychopathy in the workplace—although psychopaths typically represent a relatively small fraction of workplace staff—can do enormous damage when in senior management roles. Psychopaths are usually most common at higher levels of corporate organizations, and their actions often cause a ripple effect throughout an organization, setting the tone for an entire corporate culture. Examples of detrimental effects are increased bullying, conflict, stress, staff turnover and absenteeism; reduction in productivity and in social responsibility. Ethical standards of entire organisations can be badly damaged if a corporate psychopath is in charge. A 2017 UK study found that companies with leaders who show "psychopathic characteristics" destroy shareholder value, tending to have poor future returns on equity.

Academics refer to psychopaths in the workplace individually variously as workplace psychopaths, executive psychopaths, corporate psychopaths, business psychopaths, successful psychopaths, office psychopaths, white-collar psychopaths, industrial psychopaths, organizational psychopaths or occupational psychopaths. Criminal psychologist Robert D. Hare coined the term "snakes in suits" as a synonym for workplace psychopaths.

General
Oliver James identifies psychopathy as one of the dark triadic personality traits in the workplace, the others being narcissism and Machiavellianism.

Workplace psychopaths are often charming to staff above their level in the workplace hierarchy but abusive to staff below their level. They maintain multiple personas throughout the office, presenting each colleague with a different version of themselves.

Hare considers newspaper tycoon Robert Maxwell to have been a strong candidate as a corporate psychopath.

Incidence
Hare reports that about 1 percent of the general population meets the clinical criteria for psychopathy. Hare further claims that the prevalence of psychopaths is higher in the business world than in the general population. Figures of around 3–4% have been cited for more senior positions in business. A 2011 study of Australian white-collar managers found that 5.76 percent could be classed as psychopathic and another 10.42 percent dysfunctional with psychopathic characteristics.

The organizational psychopath
Organizational psychopaths crave a god-like feeling of power and control over other people. They prefer to work at the very highest levels of their organizations, allowing them to control the greatest number of people. Psychopaths who are political leaders, managers, and CEOs fall into this category.

Organizational psychopaths generally appear to be intelligent, sincere, powerful, charming, witty, and entertaining communicators. They quickly assess what people want to hear and then create stories that fit those expectations. They will con people into doing their work for them, take credit for other people's work and even assign their work to junior staff members. They have low patience when dealing with others, display shallow emotions, are unpredictable, undependable and fail to take responsibility if something goes wrong that is their fault.

According to a study from the University of Notre Dame published in the Journal of Business Ethics, psychopaths have a natural advantage in workplaces overrun by abusive supervision, and are more likely to thrive under abusive bosses, being more resistant to stress, including interpersonal abuse, and having less of a need for positive relationships than others.

Careers with highest proportion of psychopaths
According to Kevin Dutton, the ten careers with the highest proportion of psychopaths are: 

Workplace psychopaths may show a high number of the following behavior patterns. The individual behaviors are not exclusive to the workplace psychopath, though the higher the number of patterns exhibited, the more likely they conform to the psychopath profile:
 Public humiliation of others (high propensity of having temper tantrums or ridiculing work performance)
 Malicious spreading of lies (intentionally deceitful)
 Remorseless, devoid of guilt
 Frequently lie to push one's own point
 Produce exaggerated bodily expressions (yawning, sneezing, etc.) as a means of gaining attention
 Rapidly shift between emotions – used to manipulate people or cause high anxiety
 Intentionally isolate persons from organizational resources
 Quick to blame others for mistakes or for incomplete work even though they are guilty
 Encourage co-workers to torment, alienate, harass, and/or humiliate other peers
 Take credit for others' accomplishments
 Steal and/or sabotages other persons' work
 Refuse to take responsibility for misjudgements and/or errors
 Respond inappropriately to stimuli, such as with a high-pitched and forced laugh
 Threaten any perceived enemy with discipline and/or job loss in order to taint employee file
 Set unrealistic and unachievable job expectations to set employees up for failure
 Refuse or are reluctant to attend meetings with more than one person
 Refuse to provide adequate training and/or instructions to singled-out victim
 Invade personal privacy of others
 Have multiple sexual encounters with other employees
 Develop new ideas without real follow-through
 Very self-centered and extremely egotistical (often conversation revolves around them – great deal of self-importance)
 Often "borrow" money and/or other material objects without any intentions of giving it back
 Will do whatever it takes to close the deal (no regard for ethics or legality)

How a typical workplace psychopath climbs to and maintains power
The authors of the book Snakes in Suits: When Psychopaths Go to Work describe a five-phase model of how a typical workplace psychopath tries to climb and maintains power:
  Entry – psychopaths may use highly developed social skills and charm to obtain employment into an organization. At this stage it could be difficult to spot anything indicative of psychopathic behaviour, and as a new employee, the psychopath might be perceived by people to be helpful and even benevolent.
  Assessment – psychopaths categorize people according to personal usefulness, and people could be recognized as either a pawn (who has some informal influence and will be easily manipulated) or a patron (who has formal position and can be used by the psychopath to protect against attacks).
  Manipulation – psychopaths try to create a scenario of “psychopathic fiction” where positive information about themselves and negative disinformation or gossip about others, where people's role as a part of a network of pawns or patrons could be utilized and could be groomed into accepting the psychopath's agenda.
  Confrontation – the psychopath can use techniques of character assassination to maintain their agenda, and people will be either discarded as a pawn or used as a patron.
  Ascension – the role of the subject as a patron in the psychopath’s quest for power will be discarded, and the psychopath will take for himself/herself a position of power and prestige from anyone who once supported them.

Why psychopaths are readily hired
Leading commentators on psychopathy have said that companies inadvertently attract employees who are psychopaths because of the wording of their job advertisements and their desire to engage people who are prepared to do whatever it takes to be successful in business. However, in one case at least, an advert explicitly asked for a sales executive with psychopathic tendencies. The advert title read "Psychopathic New Business Media Sales Executive Superstar! £50k - £110k".

Corporate psychopaths are readily recruited into organizations because they make a distinctly positive impression at interviews. They appear to be alert, friendly and easy to get along with and talk to. They look like they are of good ability, emotionally well adjusted and reasonable, and these traits make them attractive to those in charge of hiring staff within organizations. Unlike narcissists, psychopaths are better able to create long-lasting favorable first impressions, though people may still eventually see through their facades. Psychopaths’ undesirable personality traits may be easily misperceived by even skilled interviewers.  Skilled interviewers can easily discern psychopathic qualities by including extremely skeptical high performing loyal employees throughout the entire interview of each interview while maintaining emotional balance.  For instance, skilled interviewers can understand that sometimes irresponsibility may be misconstrued by employers as risk-taking or entrepreneurial spirit and are encouraged to deeply query and understand if being employed is specific to building responsibility and a career or its the other. Their thrill-seeking tendencies may be conveyed as high energy and enthusiasm for the job or work and skilled interviewers must strive to unravel the misconstrued to know and understand specific to the interviewees intentions. Their superficial charm may be misinterpreted by interviewers as charisma and yet obvious to skeptics and high performers. It is worth noting that psychopaths are not only accomplished liars, they are also more likely to lie in interviews. For instance, psychopaths may create fictitious work experiences or resumes and skeptical high performers can easily discern such fiction. They may also fabricate credentials such as diplomas, certifications, or awards and due diligence and skeptics and high performers easily discern such fabrications. Thus, in addition to seeming competent and likable in interviews, psychopaths are also more likely to outright make-up information during interviews than non-psychopaths and thus the necessity of including extremely skeptical high performing loyal employees throughout the entire interview and review of each interview.

Why psychopaths are readily promoted
Corporate psychopaths within organizations may be singled out for rapid promotion because of their polish, charm, and cool decisiveness and yet can also be singled out for rapid firing and removal. They are also helped by their manipulative and bullying skills. They create confusion around them (divide and rule etc.) using instrumental bullying to promote their own agenda. 

Psychopaths are able to maintain calm when others are reacting to normal stress and dangerous situations. Psychopaths are well versed in impression management and ingratiation, both skills that can be used to impress people in positions of power and are also obvious indications of psychopathic traits easily discerned.

Bad consequences
Boddy identifies the following bad consequences of workplace psychopathy (with additional cites in some cases): 
 Workplace bullying of employees
 Employees lose their jobs
 Legal liabilities
 Shareholders lose their investments
 Wasted employee time
 Suboptimal employee performance
 Increased workload
 Difficult working conditions
 Poor levels of job satisfaction
 Lower perceived levels of corporate social responsibility
 Raised staff turnover
 Absenteeism
 Heightened level of workplace conflict – arguments, yelling, rudeness, divide and conquer
 Counterproductive work behavior

Counterproductive work behavior

Boddy suggests that because of abusive supervision by corporate psychopaths, large amounts of anti-company feeling will be generated among the employees of the organisations that corporate psychopaths work in. This should result in high levels of counterproductive behaviour as employees give vent to their anger with the corporation, which they perceive to be acting through its corporate psychopathic managers in a way that is eminently unfair to them.

According to a 2017 UK study, a high ranking corporate psychopath could trigger lower ranked staff to become workplace bullies as a manifestation of counterproductive work behavior.

Corporate psychopath theory of the global financial crisis

Boddy makes the case that corporate psychopaths were instrumental in causing the 2007–08 global financial crisis. He claims that the same corporate psychopaths who probably caused the crisis by greed and avarice are now advising government on how to get out of the crisis.

Psychologist Oliver James has described the credit crunch as a “mass outbreak of corporate psychopathy which resulted in something that very nearly crashed the whole world economy.”

For example, during this financial crisis, the behaviour of some key people at the top of the world's largest banks came under scrutiny. At the time of its collapse in 2008 the Royal Bank of Scotland was the world's fifth largest bank by market capitalisation. CEO Fred "the Shred" Goodwin was known for taking excessive risks and showing little concern for his mismanagement, which led to the bank's collapse. Goodwin's demeanour toward colleagues was unpredictable and he is said to have lived a luxury lifestyle while fostering a culture of fear.

Renowned psychotherapist Professor Manfred F. R. Kets de Vries singled out Goodwin and former Barclays CEO Bob Diamond as exhibiting psychopathic behaviours in his working paper on the SOB, "seductive operational bully - or psychopath lite"

Screening
From an organizational perspective, organizations can insulate themselves from the organizational psychopath by taking the following steps when recruiting:
 conduct behavioral type interview
 verify information contained in the curriculum vitae
 conduct reference checks
 obtain work samples
 carry out criminal reference checks

The following tests could be used to screen psychopaths:

 Psychopathy Checklist: Screening Version (PCL: SV)
 Psychopathy Measure – Management Research Version (PM-MRV) 
 Business-Scan (B-SCAN) test

There have been anecdotal reports that at least one UK bank was using a psychopathy measure to actively recruit psychopaths.

Research findings based on the PM-MRV may have little relevance to medical psychopathy.

Workplace bullying overlap

Narcissism, lack of self-regulation, lack of remorse, and lack of conscience have been identified as traits displayed by bullies. These traits are shared with psychopaths, indicating that there is some theoretical cross-over between bullies and psychopaths. Bullying is used by corporate psychopaths as a tactic to humiliate subordinates. Bullying is also used as a tactic to scare, confuse and disorient those who may be a threat to the activities of the corporate psychopath. Using meta data analysis on hundreds of UK research papers, Boddy concluded that 36% of bullying incidents were caused by the presence of corporate psychopaths. According to Boddy, there are two types of bullying:

 Predatory bullying – the bully just enjoys bullying and tormenting vulnerable people for the sake of it.
 Instrumental bullying – the bullying is for a purpose, helping the bully achieve his or her goals.

A corporate psychopath uses instrumental bullying to further his goals of promotion and power as the result of causing confusion and divide and rule.

People with high scores on a psychopathy rating scale are more likely to engage in bullying, crime, and drug use than other people. Hare and Babiak noted that about 29 per cent of corporate psychopaths are also bullies. Other research has also shown that people with high scores on a psychopathy rating scale were more likely to engage in bullying, again indicating that psychopaths tend to be bullies in the workplace.

A workplace bully or abuser will often have issues with social functioning. These types of people often have psychopathic traits that are difficult to identify in the hiring and promotion process. These individuals often lack anger management skills and have a distorted sense of reality. Consequently, when confronted with the accusation of abuse, the abuser is not aware that any harm was done.  Team ethics and values prevent, detect, and correct bullying and mobbing in the workplace.

In fiction
 Patrick Bateman in the 1991 novel American Psycho and its 2000 film adaptation
 Lou Bloom in the 2014 film Nightcrawler
 Gordon Gekko in the 1987 film Wall Street and its sequel
 Cyril Magnus in the novel The Tyranny of Psychopaths, a satire
 Dave Matthews, the star character in the 2009 film Freefall

See also

References

Further reading
Books
Barnes, P (2012) Surviving Bullies, Queen Bees & Psychopaths in the Workplace 
Thiessen, W (2012) Slip-ups and the dangerous mind: Seeing through and living beyond the psychopath
Vaknin S and Rangelovska L (2006) The Narcissist and the Psychopath in the Workplace
 Gregory, D W (2014) Unmasking Financial Psychopaths: Inside the Minds of Investors in the Twenty-First Century

Academic articles
Babiak, P. (1995) ‘When Psychopaths go to Work: A Case Study of an Industrial Psychopath', Applied Psychology, vol. 44, no. 2, pp. 171 – 188.
Babiak, P. (2000) “Psychopathic Manipulation at Work,” in ed., C.B. Gacono, The Clinical and Forensic Assessment of Psychopathy: A Practitioner's Guide (Mahwah, NJ: Erlbaum): 287–311
Babiak, P, C.S. Neumann, and R.D. Hare (2010) “Corporate Psychopathy: Talking the Walk,” Behavioral Sciences and the Law, 28, no. 2: 174–193
 Boddy, C. R. (2005) ‘The Implications of Corporate Psychopaths for Business and Society: An Initial Examination and A Call To Arms', Australasian Journal of Business and Behavioural Sciences, vol. 1, no. 2, pp. 30 – 40.
 Boddy. C. R. (2005) “'The Implications for Business Performance and Corporate Social Responsibility of Corporate Psychopaths” in 2nd International Conference on Business Performance and Corporate Social Responsibility, ed. M. Hopkins, Middlesex University Business School, London
 Boddy, C. R.:  (2006) "The dark side of management decisions: organisational psychopaths", Management Decision, Vol. 44 Iss: 10, pp. 1461 – 1475
 Boddy, C. R.: (2010) ‘Corporate Psychopaths and Organisational Type', Journal of Public Affairs 10(4), 300–312.
 Boddy, C. R. (2010) ‘Corporate Psychopaths and Productivity', Management Services Spring, 26–30. 
 Boddy, C. R, Ladyshewsky R, Galvin P (2010) Leaders without ethics in global business: Corporate psychopaths – Journal of Public Affairs Volume 10, Issue 3, pages 121–138, August
Boddy, C. R (2011) Corporate psychopaths, bullying and unfair supervision in the workplace Journal of Business Ethics, Volume 100, Issue 3, pp 367–379  
 Boddy, C. R (2012) The impact of corporate psychopaths on corporate reputation and marketing The Marketing Review 12 (1), 79–89
Boddy, C. R (2013) Corporate Psychopaths, Bullying and Unfair Supervision in the Workplace Aggression and Violent Behavior Volume 18, Issue 2, March–April, Pages 204–218
Boddy, C. R (2014) Corporate psychopaths, conflict, employee affective well-being and counterproductive work behaviour Journal of Business Ethics
Lee I. B. American Business Law Journal Volume 42, Issue 1–6, 65–90, Winter/Spring 2005 Is There a Cure for Corporate ‘‘Psychopathy''?
Pech, R.J., & Slade, B.W. (2007). “Organizational sociopaths: rarely challenged, often promoted. Why?,” Society and Business Review, Vol. 2 Iss: 3, pp. 254 - 269.
Smith SF, Lilienfeld SO (2013) Psychopathy in the workplace: The knowns and unknowns Aggression and Violent Behavior 18 204–218

External links
 Manfred F. R. Kets de Vries The Psychopath in the C Suite: Redefining the SOB
 Edward Malnick Why your boss could easily be a psychopath The Telegraph January 26, 2013
 The Disturbing Link Between Psychopathy And Leadership Forbes April 25, 2013
 Bosses urged to watch for workplace psychopaths ABC News October 2, 2012
 Spotting psychopaths at work BBC December 1, 2004
 Bullying and Corporate Psychopaths at Work: Clive Boddy at TEDxHanzeUniversity October 3, 2012 (see TEDx)
 Coping with Corporate Psychopath

Human resource management
Psychopathy
Workplace
Workplace bullying